Dieter Kottysch (30 June 1943 – 9 April 2017) was a German amateur middleweight boxer; he competed for West Germany in the 1968 and 1972 Olympics and won a gold medal in 1972.

1968 Olympic results
Below are the results of Dieter Kottysch, a West German welterweight boxer who competed at the 1968 Mexico City Olympic tournament:

 Round of 64: defeated Mauri Saarivainio (Finland) referee stopped contest
 Round of 32: lost to Vladimir Musalimov (Soviet Union) by decision, 0-5

1972 Olympic results
Below are the results of Dieter Kottysch who competed as a light middleweight boxer for West Germany at the 1972 Olympic tournament in Munich:

 Round of 64: bye
 Round of 32: defeated Bonifaciio Avila (Colombia) with a second-round technical knockout
 Round of 16: defeated Evengelos Oikonomakos (Greece) on points, 5-0
 Quarterfinal: defeated Mohamed Majeri (Tunisia) on points, 5-0
 Semifinal: defeated Alan Minter (Great Britain) on points, 3-2
 Final: defeated Wieslaw Rudkowski (Poland) on points, 3-2 (won gold medal)

References

External links

 
 
 

1943 births
2017 deaths
Olympic boxers of West Germany
Boxers at the 1968 Summer Olympics
Boxers at the 1972 Summer Olympics
Olympic gold medalists for West Germany
World boxing champions
Sportspeople from Gliwice
People from the Province of Silesia
Olympic medalists in boxing
German male boxers
Medalists at the 1972 Summer Olympics
Light-middleweight boxers